Eudonia axena is a moth in the family Crambidae. It was described by Edward Meyrick in 1884. It is endemic to New Zealand.

The wingspan is 19–26 mm. The forewings are variable in colour, but the markings are always of the same form. They are sometimes mixed with ochreous-greenish, or partially blackish. In males, the markings are suffused with blackish towards the costa. The hindwings of the males are pale grey, while they are ochreous posteriorly in females. Adults have been recorded on wing in March.

References

Moths described in 1884
Eudonia
Moths of New Zealand
Endemic fauna of New Zealand
Taxa named by Edward Meyrick
Endemic moths of New Zealand